Zeynep Gamze Koçer (15 April 1998) is a Turkish women's football forward currently playing in the Turkish Women's First League for Beşiktaş with jersey number 9. She is a member of the Turkey national U-19 team.

Club career 
Koçer joined Beşiktaş J.K. in the 2014–15, which competed in the Women's Regional League. She enjoyed her team's champion title in two successive seasons getting promoted finally to the First League. She enjoyed the champion title of her team in the 2018-19 season. Following her team's champions title in the 2020-21 Turkcell League season,  she played inonematces of the 2021–22 UEFA Women's Champions League qualifying rounds.

International career 
Koçer was admitted to the Turkey national U-19 team debuting in the friendly match against Russia on 8 December 2015. She was part of the team, which became champion of the 2016 UEFA Women's Under-19 Development Toırnament. She took part in every three matches of the 2017 UEFA Women's Under-19 Championship qualification - Group 10 and Elite round - Group 2.

Personal life 
Growing up, Koçer was a fan of Spanish footballer Fernando Torres.

Career statistics 
.

Honours

Club
Turkish Women's First League
Beşiktaş J.K.
 Winners (2): 2018–19, 2020–21
 Runners-up (2): 2016–17, 2017–18

Turkish Women's Second League
Beşiktaş J.K.
 Winners (1): 2015–16

Turkish Women's Third League
Beşiktaş J.K.
 Winners (1): 2014–15

International
UEFA Development Tournament
 Turkey women's U-19
 Winners (1): 2016

References

External links 

1998 births
Living people
People from Bakırköy
Footballers from Istanbul
Turkish women's footballers
Women's association football forwards
Beşiktaş J.K. women's football players
Turkish Women's Football Super League players
21st-century Turkish women